Section 68 of the Constitution Act, 1867 is a provision of the Constitution of Canada relating to the seats of government of the four original provinces, New Brunswick, Nova Scotia, Ontario and Quebec.

The Constitution Act, 1867 is the constitutional statute which established Canada.  Originally named the British North America Act, 1867, the Act continues to be the foundational statute for the Constitution of Canada, although it has been amended many times since 1867.  It is now recognised as part of the supreme law of Canada.

Constitution Act, 1867

The Constitution Act, 1867 is part of the Constitution of Canada and thus part of the supreme law of Canada.  It was the product of extensive negotiations by the governments of the British North American provinces in the 1860s. The Act sets out the constitutional framework of Canada, including the structure of the  federal government and the powers of the federal government and the provinces.  Originally enacted in 1867 by the British Parliament under the name the British North America Act, 1867, in 1982 the Act was brought under full Canadian control through the Patriation of the Constitution, and was renamed the Constitution Act, 1867.  Since Patriation the Act can only be amended in Canada, under the amending formula set out in the Constitution Act, 1982.

Text of section 68 

Section 68 reads:

Section 68 is found in Part V of the Constitution Act, 1867, dealing with provincial constitutions.  It has not been amended since the Act was enacted in 1867.

Purpose and interpretation

Section 68 defines the capitals of the four original provinces.  The established capitals of New Brunswick and Nova Scotia were continued, but capitals had to be assigned for the two new provinces created by the Act, Ontario and Quebec.  All four were chosen as capitals in part for military reasons, with two based on the risk of conflict with the United States.

Quebec City was the oldest city of the four, but had an interrupted tenure as a provincial capital.  Its military significance was its location at the point where the St. Lawrence estuary narrows into the St. Lawrence River, which was the cut-off point for large ocean-going warships entering the St. Lawrence. Quebec was the oldest city in New France, and had served as the capital of the French colony of Canada.  It had also served as the capital of the British Province of Quebec (from 1763 to 1791), and then as the capital of Lower Canada from 1791 to 1841.  However, after the creation of the Province of Canada in 1841, Kingston became the first capital of the new province.  Quebec later served as the capital of the Province of Canada from 1852 to 1856, and again from 1859 to 1866.  Quebec became the capital of the new province of Quebec on July 1, 1867.

Halifax was the second oldest provincial capital, having served as the capital of the British colony of Nova Scotia since 1749.  Its deep harbour, ice-free year round, made it a valuable port for the Royal Navy.  Halifax was one of the main stations for the Royal Navy in British North America in the 18th and 19th centuries.  Halifax continued as the capital of the province of Nova Scotia after Confederation in 1867.

Fredericton was made the capital of the British colony of New Brunswick in 1783.  The site was chosen because it was well-inland, and thus not vulnerable to naval attack from the United States.  It continued as the capital of the province of New Brunswick after Confederation.

Toronto, originally named York, had been the second capital of Upper Canada.  Newark (now Niagara-on-the-Lake) was the first capital of Upper Canada, but the capital was moved to York because Newark was too close to the United States, being just across the Niagara River from Fort Niagara, New York.  Even so, York was attacked and occupied by invading American forces during the War of 1812, in the Battle of York, April 1813.  Before the American invaders left, they burnt down several government buildings, including the provincial Parliament and the Government House, and looted private property.  In spite of that attack, York continued to be the capital of Upper Canada until the Province of Canada was created, when Kingston became the capital of the new province.  York was renamed Toronto in 1834.  It served as the capital of the Province of Canada from 1849 to 1852, and again from 1856 to 1858.  It became the capital of the new province of Ontario on July 1, 1867.

Related provisions
Section 16 of the Act provides that Ottawa will be the capital of Canada.

References 

Constitution of Canada
Canadian Confederation
Federalism in Canada